Jean V may refer to

 Jean V de Bretagne (1389–1442)
 Jean V of Armagnac (1420–1473) 
 Jean V de Bueil (1406–1477)